Armillaria melleorubens is a species of mushroom in the family Physalacriaceae. This species is found in Central America.

See also 
 List of Armillaria species

References 

melleorubens
Fungal tree pathogens and diseases